Rashia Tashan Fisher (born December 18, 1974), known professionally as Rah Digga, is an American rapper and actress. She is best known as a longtime member of the Flipmode Squad, a hip hop group led by Busta Rhymes. Her debut album, Dirty Harriet (2000), peaked in the top-20 of the Billboard 200, and she released her second album, Classic, in 2010. She starred in the horror film Thirteen Ghosts (2001) as Maggie.

Early life
Rah Digga was born in New Jersey. She studied electrical engineering at the New Jersey Institute of Technology. She learned how to rap by studying the raps of KRS-One, Rakim, and Kool G Rap of the Juice Crew.

Career

Music
She worked with hip hop group Twice the Flavor before joining the Outsidaz, leading to a feature on the track "Cowboys" from the Fugees album The Score. She was spotted by Q-Tip at the Lyricist Lounge which led to her meeting Busta Rhymes and joining his Flipmode Squad. She has appeared on several Busta Rhymes albums. Her debut solo, Dirty Harriet, was released in 2000 and featured Busta Rhymes and Eve. She also worked with Bahamadia on the track "Be Ok" from Lyricist Lounge, Vol. 1. At that time they were the two leading women of the Lyricist Lounge movement, which also served as the home base for artists such as Mos Def, Talib Kweli, Pharaohe Monch, Common Sense, Lord Have Mercy, Foxy Brown and Shabaam Sahdeeq. In 2001 she starred in the film Thirteen Ghosts and sang the title track "Mirror Mirror" on the soundtrack. Also in 2001, she performed with Deborah Cox, Monica, Tamia and Mýa at Michael Jackson: 30th Anniversary Celebration contributing an original rap verse to "Heal the World".

Her second album Everything Is a Story was due to be released on Clive Davis's J Records in 2004, but was shelved. Many songs from the album had leaked to the internet in an unofficial 23-track album of unreleased material, and in 2010 Rah Digga released her own version of the album, featuring additional tracks. Rah Digga released a new album, Classic, in 2010. Production was handled by Nottz, and a promo single was released entitled "This Ain't No Lil Kid Rap". Since then she has been releasing music independently through SoundCloud, Bandcamp and the iTunes Store. Digga currently co-hosts a podcast, Yanadameen Godcast, with a fellow rapper Lord Jamar and comedian, Godfrey.

Acting
Rah Digga first appeared in Da Hip Hop Witch (2000), playing a fictionalized version of herself. She was then cast in the film Thirteen Ghosts (2001) alongside Tony Shalhoub, F. Murray Abraham, Shannon Elizabeth and Matthew Lillard in her first real acting role. In the same year, she also appeared alongside Beyoncé and Joy Bryant in MTV's Carmen: A Hip Hopera (2001). In 2003 and 2009, she was featured in the documentary films Queens of Hip Hop (with Salt-N-Pepa) and Say My Name (with Erykah Badu, Jean Grae, Miz Korona, Remy Ma, and MC Lyte, among others). Additionally, Digga has appeared as a guest star on The Mo'Nique Show. Digga is a cast member of the film "Stars" (2022), Directed by Mars Roberge.

Public image and personal life
Rah Digga has been called "one of rap's most prominent women MCs" by AllMusic and "one of hip hop's most skilled female MCs" in the book How to Rap.

She was in a relationship with fellow rapper Young Zee. The couple has a daughter named Sativa, born in 1997.

Discography

Studio albums
 Dirty Harriet (2000)
 Classic (2010)

Filmography

Film

Awards and nominations
BET Awards
2006: Video of the Year ("Touch It (remix)"), Nominated
2006: Best Collaboration ("Touch It (remix)"), Nominated
2004: Best Female Hip-Hop Artist, Nominated
2002: Best Female Hip-Hop Artist, Nominated
BET Hip Hop Awards
2006: Hip-Hop Video of the Year ("Touch It (remix)"), Nominated
2006: Best Collabo ("Touch It (remix)"), Winner
2006: People's Champ Award ("Touch It (remix)"), Nominated
MTV Video Music Award
2006: Best Rap Video ("Touch It (remix)"), Nominated
2006: Best Male Video ("Touch It (remix)"), Nominated

References

External links
 
Rah Digga Bandcamp page
Rah Digga on Discogs
Greatest Female Rappers of All Time
Busta Rhymes featuring Rah Digga

African-American actresses
American women rappers
African-American women rappers
Living people
New Jersey Institute of Technology alumni
Rappers from Newark, New Jersey
Actresses from Newark, New Jersey
1972 births
21st-century American rappers
21st-century American women musicians
21st-century African-American women
21st-century African-American musicians
20th-century African-American people
20th-century African-American women
American women podcasters
American podcasters
21st-century women rappers